The Torneo Gran Alternativa (2011) was a professional wrestling tournament event held by the Mexican professional wrestling promotion Consejo Mundial de Lucha Libre (CMLL) that took place from March 25 until April 8, 2011 over the course of three CMLL Super Viernes shows. The Torneo Gran Alternativa (Spanish for "the Great Alternative tournament) concept sees a Novato or rookie team up with an experienced wrestler for a tag team tournament. The rookie winner is often elevated up the ranks of CMLL as a result of winning the tournament, but there is no specific "prize" awarded for winning the tournament beyond a symbolic trophy.

The tournament was won by rookie Escorpión and veteran Último Guerrero as they defeated rookie Metal Blanco and veteran Máscara Dorada in the finals. Following the victory Escorpión took the ring name Rey Escorpión ("Scorpion King") and became a member of Último Guerrero's Los Guerreros del Infierno faction in CMLL.

History
Starting in 1994 the Mexican professional wrestling promotion Consejo Mundial de Lucha Libre (CMLL) created a special tournament concept where they would team up a novato, or rookie, with a veteran for a single-elimination tag team tournament. The tournament was called El Torneo Gran Alternativa, or "the Great Alternative Tournament" and became a recurring event on the CMLL calendar. CMLL did not hold a Gran Alternativa tournament in 1997 and 2000 held on each year from 2001 through 2011. The 2011 Gran Alternativa tournament was the 17th overall Gran Alternativa tournament. All tournaments have been held in Arena México, CMLL's main venue and as part of the CMLL Super Viernes show.

Tournament background
The tournament will feature 15 professional wrestling matches with different wrestlers teaming up, some of which may be involved in pre-existing scripted feuds or storylines while others are simply paired up for the tournament. Wrestlers portray either villains (referred to as Rudos in Mexico) or fan favorites (Técnicos in Mexico) as they compete in wrestling matches with pre-determined outcomes. The tournament format follows CMLL's traditional tournament formats, with two qualifying blocks of eight teams that compete on the first and second week of the tournament and a final match between the two block winners. The qualifying blocks were one-fall matches while the tournament finals will be a best two-out-of-three falls tag team match. Each qualifying block started with all 8 Novatos competing in a "seeding" battle royal to determine the brackets for the block.

2012 Gran Alternativa participants

On the rookie side Fuego, then known as "Flash" had participated in the 2007Gran Alternativa and was the "rookie" with the longest time between appearances, four years. Rey Cometa had previously participated in the Gran Alternativa 2009 and 2010. Ángel de Plata, Diamante, Guerrero Maya Jr., Puma King and Tiger (As "Tiger Kid") had also competed in the tournament as rookies in previous years. It was the first Gran Alternativa tournament for rookies Escorpión, Hijo del Signo, Magnus, Mortiz, Dragon Lee, Hombre Bala Jr., Lestat, Metal Blanco and Palacio Negro. The veteran field include former Gran Alternativa winners Último Guerrero (both as a rookie and a vet), Negro Casas, Blue Panther, La Sombra, Atlantis and La Máscara (who won as a team).

Tournament results
Block A took place on Friday night March 25, 2011, and saw rookie Escorpión and Último Guerrero defeat three other teams to win their block. The following week Block B took place and was won by Máscara Dorada and Metal Blanco. The finals of the tournament were held on April 8, 2011 where Escorpión and Último Guerrero defeated Máscara Dorada and Metal Blanco two falls to one to win the entire tournament.

Tournament brackets

Tournament shows
March 25, 2011 Super Viernes

April 1, 2011 Super Viernes

April 8, 2011 Super Viernes

Aftermath
In the weeks following the Gran Alternativa tournament, Escorpión modified his name to "Rey Escorpión" ("Scorpion King"), to help emphasize his rise in the ranks of CMLL. He would also join Último Guerrero's faction Los Guerreros del Infierno ("The Warriors of the Inferno") alongside Dragón Rojo Jr. Early in 2012 Rey Escorpión's rise in CMLL continued as he started a feud with Black Warrior, which grew in intensity over the following months. He participated in the 2012 Torneo Nacional De Parejas Increibles where he teamed up with rival Black Warrior, furthering the storyline between the two as their inability to get along caused them to be eliminated by Marco Corleone and Último Guerrero. The storyline with Black warrior reached its conclusion on June 1, 2012, when Rey Escorpión defeated his opponent in a Luchas de Apuestas match, forcing Black Warrior to have his hair shaved off after the match. Rey Escorpión teamed up with rookie Boby Zavala to win the 2013 Gran Alternativa tournament, defeating Hombre Bala Jr. and Atlantis in the finals.

Metal Blanco and Palacio Negro both received new ring name and masks, becoming known as Tritón and Titán respectively. Metal Blanco, as Tritón, would compete n the 2012 Gran Alternativa tournament with no reference to his 2011 participation. He teamed up with Atlantis and made it to the finals before losing to tournament winners Euforia and El Terrible. Palacio Negro, as Titán, also took part in the tournament, teaming with Máscara Dorada, again with no reference to his previous tournament participation.

References

2011 in professional wrestling
CMLL Torneo Gran Alternativa
March 2011 events in Mexico
April 2011 events in Mexico